Harvey Jolly (born 1 August 1960) is an Australian cricketer. He played in eight first-class matches for South Australia in 1987/88.

See also
 List of South Australian representative cricketers

References

External links
 

1960 births
Living people
Australian cricketers
South Australia cricketers